Neolamprologus multifasciatus is one of the small shell-dwelling cichlids endemic to Lake Tanganyika. The male reaches  in length, and the female only  in the aquarium. This makes them one of the smallest cichlid species in the world. Its natural habitat is the Neothauma shell beds of Lake Tanganyika, where it forms huge colonies with thousands of individuals. Their unique behavior is associated with their affinity to shells. They burrow sand to move shells, take refuge in shells and also breed in them. They have pale white coloring with black vertical bars running the length of their bodies. The species is sexually monomorphic, meaning sexing individuals is extremely hard or impossible based on external appearance alone (although size separates them when fully adult).

Aquarium care
In the aquarium trade N. multifasciatus are commonly known as "multies" and are moderately popular. Stores specializing in fish or quality fish stores will at least be aware of shell dwelling fish even if they are not stocked at that time. They are not as popular as larger cichlids but because they are suitable for smaller tanks and due to their prolific nature they still are widely available.

Tank requirements are very similar to other African cichlids, an example is the Mbuna. Unique requirements include a sandy substrate for burrowing and the placement of shells. A tank should have at least one shell per fish, ideally two.

Two other species of fish are similar to N. multifasciatus; N. similis and  N. brevis. The three species are similar enough that stores normally sell them all under the common name "shellbreeders",  "Breeding Material" or "shell dwellers".

See also
List of freshwater aquarium fish species

References
http://www.cichlid-forum.com/profiles/species.php?id=1749
Maréchal, C. and M. Poll, 1991. Neolamprologus. p. 274-294. In: J. Daget, J.-P. Gosse, G.G. Teugels and D.F.E. Thys van den Audenaerde (eds.) Check-list of the freshwater fishes of Africa (CLOFFA). ISNB, Brussels; MRAC, Tervuren; and ORSTOM, Paris. Vol. 4.
Axelrod, H.R., 1993. The most complete colored lexicon of cichlids. T.F.H. Publications, Neptune City, New Jersey.

External links

 
 

multifasciatus
Taxa named by George Albert Boulenger
Fish described in 1906